Quchan (also Romanized as Qūchān and Quçan; also known as Khabushan, Gochan) is a city and capital of Quchan County, in Razavi Khorasan Province, Iran. It is located due south of the border city of Ashgabat.  At the 2006 census, its population was 96,953, in 25,066 families.

The city of Quchan has been considered in the past due to its historical location, including having 140 historical monuments and having 32 monuments registered in the list of national monuments and 20 attractive tourist areas. This city, has trained famous scholars, mystics, thinkers, poets and heroes. Heroes such as Jafar Gholi Zangli and Noei khaboushani and Ahmad Vafadar who technically struck the heroes Abbas Zandi and Gholamreza Takhti and won the wrestling armband for three consecutive national championships.

Population and administrative divisions of the country 
Quchan city is located in 10 km of old Quchan (ancient city) and its distance to Mashhad is about 130 km and to Bajgiran (Iran-Turkmenistan border) 84 km and to the center of Turkmenistan (Ashgabat) is 118 km and has two important parts. The central part and the part of the tax collectors. According to the general population and housing census in 2016, the population of this city was 100,604 people (in 30,099 households). Since 1316, when the first law of national division was approved, Quchan was recognized as one of the seven provinces of Greater Khorasan along with the cities of Bojnourd, Birjand, Sabzevar, Gonabad, Mashhad and Torbat-e Heydarieh. Separated.

Ninth Province 
The ninth province was one of the 10 provinces of Iran, which was designated as the ninth province in January 1915, with the amendment of the law on the division of the country. This province included the cities of Quchan, Sabzevar, Gonabad, Bojnourd, Birjand, Torbat Heydariyeh and Mashhad (the capital of the province).

City expansion 
In 1895, after the earthquake of the previous year, the current city was built 12 km from the old city with the help of Mohammad Nasser Khan Shoa Al-Dawlah, the head of the Zafranlu tribe and Russian engineers. In the first Pahlavi period, the silo building and the water source and the arch bridge(Atrak Bridge) were built by the Germans  in Quchan.

Geography

Quchan is in the north-east of Iran in Razavi Khorasan Province at an elevation of 1,149 meters above sea level north of the Shah Jahan Mountains. It is located south of the border with Turkmenistan.  Quchan is connected by road to Mashhad, 125 km southeast and Turkmenistan, 100 km north.

Quchan has suffered from many earthquakes, and the town was relocated about 10 km east of the original town in 1895 following its destruction in another earthquake.

Climate
Quchan has a cold semi-arid climate (BSk).

Education
Quchan University of Technology
Islamic Azad University — Quchan Branch

Notable people
 Porya Yali (born 1999) - volleyball player for the Iranian national team and club Paykan Tehran.

History
On 20 June 1747, Nader Shah was assassinated in Quchan. He was surprised in his sleep by Salah Bey, captain of the guards, and stabbed with a sword. Nader was able to kill two of the assassins before he died.

A devastating earthquake in 1893 killed 10,000 residents in Quchan. The US press reported on January 28, 1894, "The bodies of ten thousand victims of the awful disaster have already been recovered. Fifty thousand cattle were destroyed at the same time. The once important and beautiful city of twenty thousand people is now only a scene of death, desolation, and terror."

Economy 
Factories and industrial areas

There are two industrial towns in Quchan city, the first town is located on Farooj road and the second town is located on Quchan-Mashhad highway.

In order to access the markets of Central Asian countries bordering Turkmenistan and close to the capital, the creation of a special economic zone in Quchan over the past few years was considered by officials and elites of Quchan. In a part of the industrial town, number two has been presented to the parliament after passing its legal process and is about to be established.

References 

  
 The website about Quchan city

See also

The Story of the Daughters of Quchan, a 1998 political history by Afsaneh Najmabadi.

Populated places in Quchan County
Cities in Razavi Khorasan Province
Nishapur Quarter